Yuliana Monroy (born 20 September 1998) is a Colombian tennis player.

Monroy has a career-high singles ranking by the Women's Tennis Association (WTA) of 683, achieved on 4 April 2022. She also has a career-high doubles ranking by the WTA of 1059, achieved on 25 October 2021.

Monroy made her WTA main draw debut at the 2022 Copa Colsanitas, where she was given a wildcard into the singles main draw.

ITF Circuit finals

Singles: 1 (1 runner-up)

References

External links
 
 

1998 births
Living people
Colombian female tennis players
20th-century Colombian women
21st-century Colombian women